Stephensport is an unincorporated community in Breckinridge County, Kentucky, United States.

Climate
The climate in this area is characterized by hot, humid summers and generally mild to cool winters.  According to the Köppen Climate Classification system, Stephensport has a humid subtropical climate, abbreviated "Cfa" on climate maps.

Geography

History

Richard Stephens served as a private in the Continental Army for 3 years during the American Revolution. For his service to George Washington, Richard Stephens, in February 1784, then 29 years old, accepted a 100,000 land grant on the Ohio River in Kentucky. Over time, Richard Stephens added more land to his estate. By 1799, with over 100,000 acres (about 150 square miles), including a large plantation 8 miles south of Hawesville and the land Stephensport was sitting on, and at least a dozen slaves, Richard Stephens was the wealthiest landowner in Breckinridge County.

Stephensport, which was plotted in 1803, and named in his honor. It was incorporated in 1825.

Post office
Stephensport has a post office with ZIP code 40170, which opened on December 12, 1825.

References

Unincorporated communities in Breckinridge County, Kentucky
Unincorporated communities in Kentucky
Kentucky populated places on the Ohio River